Two parliamentary elections took place in Iceland in 1916:

 Icelandic parliamentary election, August 1916
 Icelandic parliamentary election, October 1916